= Lujaina Al Aseel =

Syrian illustrator (born 1946)

- Born: 1946 (age 79–80); Damascus
- Occupation: Illustrator

Lujaina Al-Aseel (born 1946 in Damascus) is a Syrian writer, illustrator and formative artist who works in paintings and artistic supervision in Syrian and Arab children's magazines and books.

== Education ==
She graduated in 1969 from the Faculty of Fine Arts at Damascus University with a Bachelor's degree in visual communications and interior architecture.

== Artistic and professional life ==
Al Aseel taught children’s book illustrations and interior architecture at the Faculty of Fine Arts at the University of Damascus. She gave dozens of lectures in her field and supervised numerous workshops on children's book drawings in Syria and abroad, such as Italy, Kuwait, the Emirates, Tunisia and Lebanon.

In the field of design, Al Aseel has designed numerous advertising campaigns, decoration, theatrical characters and children's puppets, drawings for ten cartoon films, script and drawings for 26 children's television episodes, as well as screenwriting for children's magazines, designing and drawing over 70 children's books published in Syria, Lebanon, Jordan, Egypt and the United Arab Emirates, and accredited an art expert for children's books in the Syrian Ministry of Culture.

Al Aseel owns more than 200 paintings acquired by museums, and has held several solo exhibitions of painting and photography in Syria, Jordan, France and Italy, and has participated in many Arab and international bilateral and group exhibitions. In the field of children's book illustrations, she has participated in exhibitions in Slovakia, Japan, Iran, France, Italy, Serbia, Germany, Tunisia and the United States.

She is currently working on training professional and amateur artists in the field of drawing children's literature.
